The Miller Creek Elementary School District, formerly the Dixie School District, is a school district located in San Rafael, California that operates four schools in the northern portion of the city: Mary E. Silveira Elementary School in the Marinwood area, Vallecito Elementary School in the Terra Linda area, Lucas Valley Elementary School, and Miller Creek Middle School in the Marinwood area. All four are California Distinguished Schools.

History
The Miller Creek School District was named after a local creek and existing middle school. It was formerly named the Dixie School District after the Dixie Schoolhouse, a one-room schoolhouse built in 1864. The source of the name for the original school was in dispute and had been a source of community discussion. The Dixie school board voted in April 2019 to form a committee to choose a new name as after considering the association with the 11 states in the South that seceded from the U.S. to form the Confederacy.

The school board has five members. As of 2022, the current superintendent is Becky Rosales, former superintendent of the Waugh School District in Petaluma, who was appointed interim superintendent of Miller Creek days before the board voted to change the district name. Dr. Lustig Yamashiro (2017–2019) and Mr. Lohawasser (1997–2017) were the predecessors.

References

External links
 

School districts in Marin County, California
Education in San Rafael, California
1864 establishments in California
School districts established in 1864